Michael J. Cataldo (born June 10, 1965) is an American politician in the state of Iowa.

He was born in Des Moines, Iowa. He attended the American Institute of Business and is a businessman. He served in the Iowa House of Representatives from 1993 to 2001, serving the 68th district as a Democrat.

References

1965 births
Living people
Iowa Democrats